Jung Bu-kyung ( born May 26, 1978 in Seoul, South Korea) is a South Korean judoka and professional mixed martial artist.

Judo career 
Jung began judo at the age of eleven under the instruction of his father. He won a gold medal at the 1998 World University Judo Championships in Prague. Two years later, he won a silver medal at the -60 kg category of the 2000 Summer Olympics. In the final, he lost to three-time Olympic champion Tadahiro Nomura by ippon only fourteen seconds into the match.

After graduation from Korea National Sport University in 2001, he continued to train with the KRA Judo Team. He moved up in weight to the 66 kg class, and won a gold medal at the 2003 Asian Judo Championships in Jeju. However, Jung failed to qualify for the 2004 Olympic Games by losing to Bang Gui-man in the national qualification match.

Mixed martial arts career 
Jung made his MMA debut on 31 December 2007 against Japanese grappler Shinya Aoki at Yarennoka!. Jung was replacing American Top Team's Gesias Calvancanti, who tore a ligament in his left knee while training to fight Aoki. Although Jung lost by unanimous decision, he proved to be a formidable opponent in his mixed martial arts debut.

Mixed martial arts record 

|- 
| Loss
| align=center| 0-4
| Katsunori Kikuno
| TKO (strikes and stomps) 
| DEEP - 40 Impact
| 
| align=center| 1
| align=center| 4:15 
| Tokyo, Japan
| DEEP Lightweight Tournament Semi-finals
|-
| Loss
| align=center| 0-3
| Daisuke Nakamura
| KO (punch)
| Dream 3: Lightweight Grand Prix 2008 Second Round
| 
| align=center| 2
| align=center| 1:19
| Saitama, Japan
| 
|-
| Loss
| align=center| 0-2
| Mitsuhiro Ishida
| Decision (unanimous)
| Dream 1: Lightweight Grand Prix 2008 First Round
| 
| align=center| 2
| align=center| 5:00
| Saitama, Japan
| 
|-
| Loss
| align=center| 0-1
| Shinya Aoki
| Decision (unanimous)
| Yarennoka!
| 
| align=center| 2
| align=center| 5:00
| Saitama, Japan
|

References

External links
 
 
 

1978 births
Living people
Judoka at the 2000 Summer Olympics
Olympic judoka of South Korea
Olympic silver medalists for South Korea
Olympic medalists in judo
South Korean male mixed martial artists
Mixed martial artists utilizing judo
South Korean male judoka
Medalists at the 2000 Summer Olympics
Sportspeople from Seoul